"Moonlight Serenade" is a 1939 American popular song with original music by Glenn Miller and subsequent lyrics by Mitchell Parish.

Moonlight Serenade may also refer to:

 Moonlight Serenade (1967 film), Hong Kong film
 Moonlight Serenade (1997 film), Japanese film
 Moonlight Serenade (2009 film), American film
 Moonlight Serenade (Carly Simon album), 2005
 Moonlight Serenade (Wink album), 1988